The Watkins 23 is an American trailerable sailboat that was designed by Johannes "Jopie" Helsen, modified by Watkins Yachts and first built in 1973.

The Watkins 23 is an authorized development of the Helson 22, produced with permission of the designer.

Production
The design was built by Watkins Yachts in the United States from 1973 to 1980, with 400 examples completed, but it is now out of production.

Design
The Watkins 23 is a recreational keelboat, built predominantly of fiberglass, with wood trim. It has a masthead sloop rig, a spooned raked stem, a near-vertical transom, a transom-hung rudder controlled by a tiller and a fixed stub keel with a centerboard. It displaces  and carries  of ballast.

The boat is normally fitted with a small  outboard motor for docking and maneuvering.

The design has sleeping accommodation for five people, with a double "V"-berth in the bow cabin, a drop-down dinette table that forms a double berth in the main cabin and an aft quarter berth on the port side. The galley is located on the port side just aft of the bow cabin. The galley is equipped with a two-burner stove and a sink. The head is located in the bow cabin, under the "V"-berth on the starboard side.

Variants
Watkins 23
Base model, introduced in 1973.
Watkins 23 XL
Improved model with a full fiberglass interior and headliner, introduced in 1977.

Operational history
The boat is supported by an active class club, the Watkins Owners.

In a 2010 review Steve Henkel wrote of the 23XL model, "best features: You get basic sailing transportation for very little money. Worst features: Construction is mediocre, with equipment such as a galvanized boat trailer winch (which can quickly rust in salt water) mounted in the cabin to hoist the centerboard."

See also
List of sailing boat types

Similar sailboats
Beneteau First 235
Hunter 23
O'Day 23
Paceship 23
Paceship PY 23
Precision 23
Rob Roy 23
Schock 23
Sonic 23
Stone Horse

References

Keelboats
1970s sailboat type designs
Sailing yachts
Trailer sailers
Sailboat type designs by Johannes "Jopie" Helsen
Sailboat types built by Watkins Yachts